A list of thriller films released in the 1950s.

References

1950s
Thriller